Francisco José Avelar (born 15 December 1969) is a Salvadoran boxer. He competed in the men's featherweight event at the 1988 Summer Olympics.

References

External links
 

1969 births
Living people
Salvadoran male boxers
Olympic boxers of El Salvador
Boxers at the 1988 Summer Olympics
Boxers at the 1987 Pan American Games
Pan American Games medalists in boxing
Pan American Games bronze medalists for El Salvador
Sportspeople from San Salvador
Featherweight boxers
Medalists at the 1987 Pan American Games